The World Conference is the governing body of the World Association of Girl Guides and Girl Scouts and meets every three years. If a country has more than one association, the associations form a federation for coordination and world representation.

As the Girl Guiding and Girl Scouting movement spread, independent national Guiding associations were set up; however, a need for international cooperation was felt.  Lady Baden-Powell founded an informal International Council in London in February 1918.  In 1920, two leaders from each known Guide country were invited to the British County Commissioners Conference held at Saint Hugh's College, Oxford. This became known as the First International Conference. The 13th World Conference was held in the same college in 1950. The member organizations continue to meet every three years (initially every two years) at World Conferences.

At the fourth World Conference held at Camp Edith Macy in 1926, representatives from several countries suggested the formation of a World Association to take the place of the informal International Council. After the 1926 International Conference the Baden-Powells were approached about setting up a formal association and in 1928 the World Association of Girl Guides and Girl Scouts was founded at the 5th International Conference held in Parád, Hungary. Rose Kerr was Vice Chairman, later Commissioner for Tenderfoot Countries.

List

 1920 – first International Conference – Oxford, England
 1922 – second International Conference – Cambridge, England
 1924 – third International Conference – Foxlease, United Kingdom
 1926 – fourth International Conference – Camp Edith Macy, New York City, United States
 1928 – fifth International Conference – Parád, Hungary – WAGGGS was formed at this Conference
 1930 – sixth World Conference – Foxlease, Hampshire, England
 1932 – seventh World Conference – Bucze near Górki Wielkie, Poland
 1934 – eighth World Conference – Adelboden, Switzerland
 1936 – ninth World Conference – Stockholm, Sweden
 1938 – tenth World Conference – Adelboden, Switzerland
 1946 – 11th World Conference – Evian, France
 1948 – 12th World Conference – Cooperstown, New York, United States
 1950 – 13th World Conference – Oxford, England
 1952 – 14th World Conference – Dombås, Norway
 1954 – 15th World Conference – Zeist, The Netherlands
 1957 – 16th World Conference – Petrópolis, Brazil
 1960 – 17th World Conference – Athens, Greece
 1963 – 18th World Conference – Nyborg, Denmark
 1966 – 19th World Conference – Tokyo, Japan
 1969 – 20th World Conference – Otaniemi, Finland
 1972 – 21st World Conference – Toronto, Canada
 1975 – 22nd World Conference – Sussex, England
 1978 – 23rd World Conference – Tehran, Iran
 1981 – 24th World Conference – Orléans, France
 1984 – 25th World Conference – Tarrytown, New York, United States
 1987 – 26th World Conference – Njoro, Kenya
 1990 – 27th World Conference – Singapore
 1993 – 28th World Conference – Nyborg, Denmark
 1996 – 29th World Conference – Wolfville, Nova Scotia Canada
 1999 – 30th World Conference – Dublin, Ireland
 2002 – 31st World Conference – Manila, Philippines 18–24 June
 2005 – 32nd World Conference – Amman, Jordan
 2008 – 33rd World Conference – Johannesburg, South Africa 6–12 July
 2011 – 34th World Conference – Edinburgh, Scotland, United Kingdom 11–15 July
 2014 – 35th World Conference – Hong Kong
 2017 – 36th World Conference – India

15th World Conference 
At the 15th World Conference it was decided to mark the centenary of the birth of Lord Baden-Powell, the founder of Guiding, by holding a World Camp with four locations – Doe Lake, Ontario, Canada; Quezon City, Philippines; Lac de Conche, Switzerland; and Windsor Great Park, England, from 19 January to 2 February 1957.

33rd World Conference 

The 33rd World Conference of the World Association of Girl Guides and Girl Scouts was held from 6 to 12 July 2008 in Johannesburg, South Africa. It was hosted by the Girl Guides Association of South Africa. It was held in the Birchwood Executive Hotel and Conference Centre. Graça Machel was the keynote speaker and received the World Citizenship Award. Over 450 delegates attended representing 144 countries.

The 33rd World Conference logo combined the WAGGGS logo and the South African Guides chosen pattern.
The Girl Guides Association of South Africa wanted to portray their African dream and the sense of unity of all Girl Guides and Girl Scouts. Ten lines within the logo symbolise the ten Laws shared by Girl Guides and Girl Scouts. The three triangles symbolise the threefold Promise. The M shape symbolises the global challenges facing Girl Guiding and Girl Scouting that can be overcome through unity.

The conference's theme was "Join in, reach out, change lives".

Graça Machel was the keynote speaker. In her address, Machel spoke about her childhood and three women who had a significant impact on her life. She also expressed her views on the contemporary state of women's rights. Deputy President of South Africa, Phumzile Mlambo-Ngcuka, also addressed the meeting.

Graça Machel was presented with the World Citizenship Award. Elspeth Henderson, the outgoing chairman of the World Board, received the WAGGGS Silver Medal, WAGGGS' highest award.

34th World Conference 

The 34th World Conference of the World Association of Girl Guides and Girl Scouts (WAGGGS) was held from 11 to 15 July 2011 in Edinburgh, Scotland. It was hosted by the Girlguiding UK and was held in the Edinburgh Conference Centre at Heriot-Watt University. Over 390 delegates attended representing 122 member organisations. It was the first WAGGGS World Conference to be held in the UK since 1975.

The theme of the conference was "100 years changing lives".

UN Women Deputy Director and Assistant Secretary-General, Lakshmi Puri, delivered the keynote address on the first day of the conference, focusing on issues including gender equality and domestic violence.

Six new associations were officially given full member status of WAGGGS at the World Conference, Guides de la République Démocratique du Congo, Association des Scouts et Guides du Congo, the Girl Guides Association of Cambodia, the Girl Guides Association of Grenada, the Swaziland Girl Guides Association and Associazione Guide Esploratori Cattolici Sammarinesi (San Marino) were awarded 'Full Membership' on day one of the conference.

35th World Conference 
The Hong Kong Girl Guides Association won their bid to host the 35th World Conference. Their successful bid was announced on the final day of the 34th World Conference. The 35th World Conference took place in Hong Kong in 2014.

References

External links
 World Association of Girl Guides and Girl Scouts
 33rd World Conference Micro Site
 Address by Ms Phumzile Mlambo-Ngcuka, Deputy President of the Republic of South Africa, at the 33rd World Conference Of Girl Guides And Girl Scouts, Johannesburg

World Association of Girl Guides and Girl Scouts
Girl Guiding and Girl Scouting